
Bytów County is a unit of territorial administration and local government (powiat) in Pomeranian Voivodeship, northern Poland. It came into being on January 1, 1999, as a result of the Polish local government reforms passed in 1998.

As of 2019 its total population is 79,260, out of which the population of Bytów is 16,918, that of Miastko is 10,439, and the rural population is 51,903.

Bytów County on a map of the counties of Pomeranian Voivodeship

Bytów County is bordered by Słupsk County to the north, Lębork County to the north-east, Kartuzy County and Kościerzyna County to the east, Chojnice County and Człuchów County to the south, and Szczecinek County and Koszalin County to the west.

Local Government
District head

 Leszek Pałasz (1998-2001)
 Andrzej Hrycyna p.o. (2001-2002)
 Michał Świątek-Brzeziński (2002-2006)
 Roman Zaborowski (2006-2007)
 Jacek Żmuda-Trzebiatowski (2007-2015)
 Leszek Waszkiewicz (from 2015)

Vice district head

 Andrzej Hrycyna (1998-2002)
 Tomasz Borowski (2002-2006)
 Krzysztof Sławski (2006-2010)
 Andrzej Marcinkowski (2010-2014)
 Zbigniew Batko (from 2014)

Chairman of the county council

 Mieczysław Bachórz (1998-2002)
 Jerzy Jobczyk (2002-2006)
 Andrzej Hrycyna (from 2006)

Administrative division
The county is subdivided into 10 gminas (two urban-rural and eight rural). These are listed in the following table, in descending order of population.

References

 
Kashubia
Land counties of Pomeranian Voivodeship